The Redskins Rule is a spurious relationship in which the results of National Football League (NFL) games correlated strongly with the results of subsequent United States presidential elections.  Briefly stated, there was a strong correlation between the outcome of the last home game for the Washington Commanders (known as the Washington Redskins from 1933 to 2020) prior to the U.S. presidential election and the outcome of the election: when Washington won, the party of the incumbent president retained the presidency; when Washington lost, the opposition party won. This coincidence was noted by many sports and political commentators, used as a bellwether to predict the results of elections, and held true in every election from 1940 through 2000.

Since 2004, the rule appears to have become inverted, with the performance of Washington now forecasting the fate of the challenging party rather than the incumbent. For example, the 2016 and 2020 victories heralded the elections of Donald Trump, and Joe Biden, respectively, while the 2004 and 2012 losses were followed up by the incumbents, George W. Bush and Barack Obama, respectively, winning a second term. However, Obama's election in 2008 followed a Washington loss, in accordance with the original rule.

History 
Since then, there have been 19 presidential elections. In 17 of those, the following rule applied:

The Redskins Rule was first noticed prior to the 2000 election by Steve Hirdt, executive vice president of the Elias Sports Bureau. That year, the Redskins would begin what would become a four-game losing streak with retrospect to the rule when they lost to the Tennessee Titans.  George W. Bush defeated Al Gore in the Electoral College, but lost the popular vote. This would cause problems for the original version of the rule after the 2004 election.

In 2004 election, the Redskins lost their last home game before the presidential election, indicating that the incumbent should have lost. However, President George W. Bush (the incumbent) went on to defeat John Kerry. Steve Hirdt modified the rule, establishing Redskins Rule 2.0:

In the election in 2000, Al Gore won the popular vote while Bush won the electoral vote, and thereby the revised Redskins Rule was upheld for the 2004 election.

In the 2008 election, the Redskins lost to the Pittsburgh Steelers, predicting a win for U.S. Senator from Illinois Barack Obama over U.S. Senator from Arizona John McCain, because George W. Bush won the popular vote in the previous election.

Prior to the 2012 election, the Redskins lost against the Carolina Panthers on November 4. The Redskins Rule predicted an outright loss for incumbent Barack Obama against challenger Mitt Romney, or that Obama would lose the popular vote but win via the Electoral College. However, incumbent Barack Obama won the election with 332 electoral votes to Romney's 206, held the advantage in the popular vote by more than 4.7 million votes, and the Redskins Rule did not hold in 2012.

In 2016, the Redskins played their last designated home game prior to the election on October 16, defeating the Philadelphia Eagles 27–20.  This outcome predicted a victory for Hillary Clinton of the Democratic Party, which was in power. Clinton's loss to Republican challenger Donald Trump in the election meant that the Redskins Rule did not hold in 2016 despite Clinton winning the popular vote.  

The rule typically does not count the team's time playing in Boston (1932–1936). The team competed as the Boston Braves in 1932 when they won 19–6 over the Staten Island Stapletons. This game does not conform to the rule, as Franklin D. Roosevelt defeated incumbent Herbert Hoover in that election. However, in 1936, the first election year the team competed under its longtime nickname, they defeated the Chicago Cardinals and the incumbent Democratic president, Roosevelt, went on to win re-election.

It is unknown as to what the status of the rule would be if the final game ended in a tie, since the rule does not account for the last home game ending in a tie. However, as a tied game would end without a winner, it could be that the rule would be upheld if the election has no winner (meaning neither candidate gets the needed 270 electoral votes).

Results

See also 
 Curse of Tippecanoe
 Mierscheid law

Notes

References

Redskins Rule
Presidential elections in the United States